Klyazmensky is a rural locality (a settlement) in Petushinskoye Rural Settlement, Petushinsky District, Vladimir Oblast, Russia. The population was 169 as of 2010. There is 1 street.

Geography 
The village is located 7 km south from Petushki.

References 

Rural localities in Petushinsky District